WBVR-FM (96.7 MHz) is a country music–formatted radio station licensed to Auburn, Kentucky, United States, and serving the Bowling Green area. The station is owned by Forever Communications, Inc. as part of a conglomerate with Bowling Green–licensed oldies station WBGN (1340 AM), Glasgow–licensed country music station WLYE-FM (94.1 FM), and Smiths Grove–licensed Top 40/CHR station WUHU (107.1 FM). All four stations share studios on Scottsville Road in southern Bowling Green, and the station's transmitter is located in northwestern Allen County just east of Alvaton.

History 
On December 11, 1963, Bowling Green Broadcasters, Inc., a subsidiary of Bahakel Communications and owner of WLBJ (1410 AM), received a construction permit to build a new FM radio station in Bowling Green on 96.7 MHz. WLBJ-FM began broadcasting in May 1965. This was the first time WLBJ had offered an FM service since the early 1950s, when it owned WBON, later WLBJ-FM.

By the late 1970s, the station was airing an album-oriented rock format known as "Natural 97 FM". This shifted to contemporary hit radio "BJ-97" in 1980. Seven years later, the station's callsign was changed to WCBZ, resulting in the rebranding to "Z-97".

In 1991, Bahakel announced it would sell WCBZ to Target Communications; it retained the AM, which it opted to shut down for good in December, with the FM station remaining silent until Target completed the sale.

After an upgrade to 25,000 watts, WCBZ returned to the air in 1992 as rock station WBZD "Buzzard 96.7". The format then changed again when the station rebranded itself "Magic" with the callsign changing to WMJM in 1993.

In July 1994, the Beaver brand and format moved to WMJM, which became the new WBVR-FM and to a second station, WVVR in Hopkinsville. Keymarket Communications, which shared some ownership with Target, had simultaneously acquired the previous Beaver station, 101.1 MHz from Russellville, along with WLAC and WLAC-FM in Nashville; the Beaver move freed up the 101.1 facility to gear itself toward Nashville as R&B-formatted WJCE-FM "The Juice".

The 25,000-watt upgrade was finally approved in 2001; as a result, the city of license for the station was changed from Bowling Green to Auburn, Kentucky.

References

External links
 
Station Website

 

Country radio stations in the United States
BVR
Radio stations established in 1965
1965 establishments in Kentucky
Logan County, Kentucky